Operation Anglo was a British Commando raid on the island of Rhodes during the Second World War. The raid was carried out by eight men of the Special Boat Section (SBS) assisted by four Greeks.

In September 1942 their mission was to attack two airfields on the island of Rhodes. The German and Italian bombers based there were  being used to attack Royal Navy convoys. After their attack, the raiding force were to return to their landing beach to be picked up by submarine. Only two surviving SBS men made it to the beach after hiding in the countryside for four days.

After the Rhodes raid the depleted SBS was absorbed into the Special Air Service, due to the casualties they had suffered. In 1954 the events of the raid were portrayed in the movie They Who Dare.

Background
By 1942, No1 Special Boat Section was based in the Middle East and attached to the Special Air Service (SAS) as the Folboat Section (named after a type of folding canoe employed in raiding operations). In July, they had taken part in the raids on airfield in Crete, and were now assigned to attack two airfields on the island of Rhodes in the Dodecanese. Rhodes, a part of the Kingdom of Italy since 1912, was being used as a base for Italian and German bombers who were attacking Royal Navy convoys.

Mission
The No. 1 Special Boat Section raiding force consisted of eight British Commandos, two Greek guides and two interpreters. The commander of the raid was Captain Richard Allott with Lieutenant David Sutherland as the second in command. The rest of the raiding group were Sergeant Moss, Corporal McKenzie, Private Blake, Marines Barrow, Harris and Duggan. The Greeks included Sub Lieutenant Calambokidis, Pavlos Moustakellis, and Antonios Moustakellis, and an unidentified fourth.

The raiding force left Beirut in two submarines,  and the Greek submarine .
Their objective were two airfields on the island of Rhodes at Kalathos and Maritsa. They reached Rhodes on 31 August 1942. The raiders were landed by using a folding boat and three inflatable floats to reach the shore on the east coast of Rhodes near Cape Feralco. After hiding their boats in some nearby caves they rested for the first day before splitting into two groups. One group, under command of Lieutenant Sutherland, headed for Kalathos  from the beach. The second group, under command of Captain Allott, made for Maritsa ( from the beach). Having no radio to contact the Royal Navy or their headquarters, they agreed to return to the beach on the night of 17/18 September to be picked up.

Allott's group penetrated their airfield, and planted their explosives. The following day they estimated from the damage they could see on the airfield, that at least 20 aircraft had been destroyed. Sutherland's group reached Kalathos over the night of 11/12 September. They established an overlooking position to observe the airfield, and settled in to identify targets and observe the airfield for the next day. The following day, they divided into two smaller groups and started their attack. Sutherland and John Duggan formed one group, with and Sub Lieutenant Calambokidis and two SBS soldiers comprising the second. In torrential rain, both groups infiltrated the airfield and placed their charges; Sutherland and Duggan placing charges on at least 13 aircraft and around a fuel dump. However, the men were spotted and fled the airfield. Only Sutherland and Duggan reached the prearranged rendezvous point, and heard shooting coming from the direction they believed the other SBS was located.

The following day, Sutherland and Duggan began their return journey to a rendezvous point near the beach with the expectation that the entire raiding force would reassemble. No one else had arrived, and in the meantime an Italian patrol ship had disembarked soldiers on the beach who had found the hidden boats. The two left a message at the rendezvous for any stragglers, and returned to the beach. Using a torch, they signalled "swimming-come in" to HMS Traveller, which was waiting off shore. The captain of the submarine, Commander Michael St John, was surprised to see the recognition signal coming from the shore and replied by using his periscope to signal back. The boat then moved towards the remnants of the raiding force and expecting to pick them up from their boats. Upon hearing the men shouting in the darkness, the crew of the submarine retrieved the two swimmers. The submarine was spotted by a patrol boat; with the SBS members on board it crash-dived and survived a depth charge attack.

Aftermath
The remaining members of the raiding party were captured, and became prisoners of war. The two Greek guides, who had already escaped from Rhodes earlier in the war, were put on trial accused of treason. Both were found guilty; one was executed and the other imprisoned. Sutherland was awarded the Military Cross and Duggan the Military Medal for their parts in the raid.

After the Rhodes raid what remained of the SBS was absorbed into the SAS due to the casualties suffered. The submarine HMS Traveller was lost with all hands two months after the operation. Captain St John was not on board at the time and survived the war.

In 1954 the events of the raid were portrayed in the movie They Who Dare, starring Dirk Bogarde and Harold Siddons.

References
Notes

Bibliography

Conflicts in 1942
World War II British Commando raids